Casaletto Ceredano is a comune (municipality) in the Province of Cremona in the Italian region Lombardy, located about  southeast of Milan and about  northwest of Cremona.

Casaletto Ceredano borders the following municipalities: Abbadia Cerreto, Capergnanica, Cavenago d'Adda, Chieve, Credera Rubbiano.

References

External links
 Official website

Cities and towns in Lombardy